House Creek is a stream in the U.S. state of Georgia. It is a tributary to the Chattahoochee River.

House Creek was named for a dwelling house along its course. A variant name was "Old House Creek".

References

Rivers of Georgia (U.S. state)
Rivers of Harris County, Georgia